Silvio Moser (24 April 1941 – 26 May 1974) was a racing driver from Switzerland.

Early life and career
Moser began his career in the early sixties, racing Alfa Romeos and moved to single seaters in 1964, with a good deal of success both in European Formula three and the Temporada Series.

Formula One

Having built a strong reputation in Formula Junior/Three, Formula Two and sports car racing Moser debuted in Formula One on 15 July 1967 at the British Grand Prix with a Vögele Team Cooper-ATS. Prior to this he had attempted to qualify for the German Grand Prix in 1966 with a Formula Two Brabham–Cosworth BT16, entered in his own name, but the engine failed in practice. He continued in 1968 with a Brabham-Repco BT20, in 1969 in a privately entered Brabham BT24 Cosworth, in 1970 with the Bellasi-Cosworth and again for one race in 1971. In total, he participated in 19 Formula One World Championship Grands Prix (12 starts), scoring a total of three championship points.

Post Formula One and death

After the failure of the Bellasi project Moser returned to Formula Two and drove a Brabham in 1971 and 1972, and a Surtees in 1973, with limited success, but managed second place at Monza in the Lottery GP.

Moser died from severe injuries without regaining consciousness, 31 days after being involved in an accident while driving his Lola T294-BMW in the 1,000 km sports car race at Monza.

Racing record

Complete Formula One World Championship results
(key)

Complete Formula One Non-Championship results
(key)

Complete European Formula Two Championship results
(key) (Races in bold indicate pole position; races in italics indicate fastest lap)

References

External links
 Official Site

1941 births
1974 deaths
Swiss racing drivers
Swiss Formula One drivers
Swiss motorsport people
Formula One team owners
Formula One team principals
Sport deaths in Italy
Racing drivers who died while racing
European Formula Two Championship drivers
Silvio Moser Racing Team Formula One drivers
Formula One entrants
Sportspeople from Zürich